Ippolito (II) d'Este (25 August 1509 – 2 December 1572) was an Italian cardinal and statesman. He was a member of the House of Este, and nephew of the other Ippolito d'Este, also a cardinal. He is perhaps best known for his despoliation of the then 1,400-year-old Hadrian's Villa, built by the Roman emperor Hadrian, removing marbles and statues from it to decorate his own villa, the Villa d'Este.

Biography
Ippolito was born in Ferrara, Italy, the second son of Duke Alfonso I d'Este and Lucrezia Borgia. His elder brother, Ercole II d'Este, succeeded his father as Duke of Ferrara in 1534. Through their mother, Ippolito and Ercole were grandsons of Pope Alexander VI. Ippolito himself is named after his uncle, Cardinal Ippolito d'Este.

In 1519, at the age of 10, he inherited the archbishopric of Milan from his uncle. This was the first of a long list of ecclesiastical benefices which Ippolito was given over time, the revenue from which was his main source of income. In addition to Milan, at the end of his life Ippolito also held the benefices of the sees/abbeys of Bondeno, Chaalis (1540–1572), Jumieges in Normandy, Lyon, Narbonne, and Saint-Médard in Soissons.

Ippolito d'Este was created Cardinal of Santa Maria in Aquiro by Pope Paul III in the consistory on 20 December 1538. He was only ordained a priest in 1564.

Patronage of the arts

A lover of luxuries and magnificence, he overhauled the Palazzo San Francesco in Ferrara before his first appointment to the French court. After his elevation to the College of Cardinals in 1538, he refurbished the palace of his cousin, Cardinal Ercole Gonzaga, which he rented as his cardinalatial residence in Rome. He had the Villa d'Este built in Tivoli by Mannerist architect Pirro Ligorio, to match the other palaces he was building in Rome. To decorate his villa, he had much of the marbles and statues taken from the nearby ancient Hadrian's Villa, as a result of which the latter is devoid of most of its original features.

Ippolito d'Este also helped to sponsor the career of the composer Palestrina.

Statesman
At the time of his elevation to Cardinal he was the Ferrarese ambassador to the French court, whose interests he was to see to personally as Cardinal-Protector of France from 1549, in the reign of Henry II. In 1550 he was governor of the French-controlled territory Tivoli. Such was the strength of his relationship with the French court that he was the French candidate in the conclave which elected Pope Julius III, Paul III's successor.

After this defeat he mostly abandoned active ecclesiastical politics, although he continued to visit Rome and, in fact, eventually died in Rome after a short illness. He was buried in Tivoli's church of Santa Maria Maggiore, next to his villa.

A significant number of Ippolito's letters and account books from his household has survived. This collection, including more than 2,000 letters and over 200 account books, is housed in the archives in Modena, a hereditary seat of the Este family. These materials form the basis for Mary Hollingsworth's book, The Cardinal's Hat: Money, Ambition, and Everyday Life in the Court of a Borgia Prince, a social history of Ippolito d'Este and his times.

References

Notes

General references
Vincenzo Pacifici (1920), Ippolito II d'Este cardinale di Ferrara, Tivoli, 1920; reprint Tivoli, 1984,  


Inventario dei beni del cardinale Ippolito II d'Este trovati nel palazzo e giardino di Tivoli (3-4 dicembre 1572)

1509 births
1572 deaths
Ippolito 2
16th-century Italian cardinals
16th-century Italian Roman Catholic bishops
Bishops of Autun
Bishops of Ferrara
Bishops of Tréguier
Archbishops of Arles
Archbishops of Milan
16th-century Italian nobility
Sons of monarchs
es:Hipólito II de Este#top